Girgashites (Heb. גִּרְגָּשִׁי) are one of the tribes who had invaded the land of Canaan as mentioned in Gen. 15:21; Deut. 7:1; Josh. 3:10; Neh. 9:8. The Girgashites are also known as the fifth ethnic group that descended from Canaan (Gen. 10:16; i Chron. 1:14). Although the Girgashites are not referred to in the narrative of the wars of conquests, and their locality is not stated, they are named by Joshua among the peoples the Israelites dispossessed (24:11). This apparent inconsistency may be due to their emigrating to North Africa prior to the Israelites entering the land. This is further supported by Procopius (Wars 4.10.13-22), stating that the Phoenician diaspora settled in the western end of the Mediterranean, in the vicinity of later day Carthage. 

They have been uncertainly identified with the Qaraqisha, allies of the Hittites in their wars with Ramses ii. If that identification is correct the Girgashites would have been part of the southward migrations from Anatolia of peoples displaced by the fall of the Hittite empire ca. 1200 b.c.e. A personal name grgš appears in Ugaritic, but its connection with this people is unknown. The sibilant termination of the biblical name suggests a Hurrian origin.

References 

Canaan
Ancient peoples of the Near East